Chalcolestes is a small genus of damselfly in the family Lestidae. They are commonly known as Willow Spreadwings. They are similar to the Spreadwings of the genus Lestes.

The name Chalcolestes comes from Greek: χαλχοσ copper and ληστησ predator.

Species
The genus contains only two species:

References

Lestidae
Zygoptera genera
Taxa named by Clarence Hamilton Kennedy